Chris Thomson (born 10 July 1985) is a former Australian rugby union footballer who played as a lock for the  between 2009 and 2010 and French side Narbonne between 2010 and 2012 (making 51 appearances and scoring two tries).

He joined the Melbourne Rebels prior to the 2014 Super Rugby season, but suffered wrist and knee injuries which saw him miss the start of the season and culminated in Thomson announcing his retirement in March 2014.

References

External links
 

Living people
1985 births
Australian rugby union players
Rugby union locks
Rugby union players from Canberra
New South Wales Waratahs players
Melbourne Rebels players
Australian expatriate rugby union players
Australian expatriate sportspeople in France
Expatriate rugby union players in France